Institute of Botany may refer to:

Institute of Botany, Chinese Academy of Sciences
Jiangsu Institute of Botany, China
Kunming Institute of Botany, China
Władysław Szafer Institute of Botany, Poland

See also
National Institute of Agricultural Botany, England